Servtrans is a railway private company from Romania.
The main activity is the railway transport as well as the logistics required by this sort of activity. During 2005, it realized the freight of 6% of the transported goods on the Romanian railway.

History
Servtrans began its activity on 21 March 2002 with shunting activities of the equipments and wagons on the building site of the rehabilitating operations on the railway infrastructure on the Pan European Transport Corridor 4, the route Bucharest–Câmpina. Later, it also began serving the Bucharest-Constanţa too.

Rail transport of goods
The company has signed agreements for access on the public railway infrastructure with both the National Railway Company and the owners of private infrastructure in Romania.

Rail transport of passengers
Servtrans operates in the line Roşiori Nord-Costeşti-Piteşti.

The rolling stock
Electric locomotives of 5100KW and 3400 KW 
Diesel electric locomotives with a power of 2100 HP 
Hydraulic diesel locomotives with a power of 1250 HP

External links
 Official website

Railway companies of Romania